Michail Pervolarakis (born 6 June 1996) is a Cypriot-born Greek tennis player.

Pervolarakis has a career high ATP singles ranking of World No. 366 achieved on 10 January 2022. He also has a career high ATP doubles ranking of World No. 157 achieved on 14 November 2022.

Pervolarakis represents Greece at the Davis Cup, where he has a W/L record of 3–3.

College career
Pervolarakis played college tennis at the University of Portland, winning WCC player of the year in 2017 and 2018.

Professional career 
He made his ATP debut at the 2022 Winston-Salem Open as a lucky loser.

Personal life
Pervolarakis has a wife, Amelia, and a daughter, Eleonora.

References

External links

1996 births
Living people
Greek Cypriot people
Greek male tennis players
Cypriot male tennis players
Portland Pilots athletes
Sportspeople from Limassol
College men's tennis players in the United States